Hemigryllus is a genus of crickets in subfamily Eneopterinae.

Taxonomy
The Orthoptera Species File database lists the following species:
Hemigryllus amazonicus Gorochov, 1997
Hemigryllus columbi Gorochov, 1996
Hemigryllus femineus Gorochov, 1986
Hemigryllus ortonii (Scudder, 1869)
Hemigryllus sharovi Gorochov, 1996
Hemigryllus vocatus Gorochov, 1999
Hemigryllus woronovi Gorochov, 1986

References

Crickets